Josef Luitz (born 2. August 1934 in Vienna) is an Austrian cellist and cello teacher. He was solo cellist of the NÖ Tonkünstlerorchester and is co-founder of the international chamber music festival  Allegro Vivo.

Biography 
He spent his childhood in Gablitz near Vienna. His father was music director of the 1. Gablitzer Musikverein. He first became an apprentice to an instrument maker.

After finishing his apprenticeship he took a job as adjuster for automatic lathes. In his spare time he took cello lessons with Walther Kleinecke and studied with Professor Nikolaus Hübner.

He began his cello career as principal cellist of the NÖ Tonkünstlerorchester, and later advanced to the post of solo cellist.
Apart from his solo performances he was involved in many chamber music ensembles and also became teacher of cello at the Konservatorium Vienna.

Josef Luitz is married to Edelgard Sonja Luitz and has two children:  Joachim (1967) and Angelika (1968).

Engagements 
 1957-62 Tonkünstler Orchestra, principal cellist
 1962-99 1st solo cellist of the Tonkünstler Orchestra
 1972-99 Konservatorium Wien, teacher for cello
 1988-89 University of Music and Performing Arts, Vienna, teacher for chambermusic

Membership in chamber music ensembles 
 1962-63 Streichtrio of the Tonkünstler Orchestra
 1963-68 Haydn Quartett Vienna with Thomas Kakuska
 1968-75 Ensemble Kontrapunkte (mainly contemporary music)
 1972-77 Philharmonia Quintett (with Wolfgang Poduschka)
 seit 1977 Tonkünstler Kammerorchester - Academia Allegro Vivo, co-founder, president and solo cellist of this orchestra
 1978-95 Concordia Trio (piano trio) with Harald Ossberger and Erich Schagerl

Courses and Seminars 
 since 1979 International Chamber Music Festival Austria Allegro Vivo (co-founder and president) 
 1981-86 Mid summernight festival in Umeå, Sweden, cello and chamber music
 1985-92 Summer seminars for music teachers in Tullnerbach and Zeillern
 1989-93 Wiener MusikSeminar (international mastercourse)  
 1992-	Wiener Musikverein-Nagano, Japan - seminars, chamber music and orchestra

Honors and awards 

 1994: Silver Decoration for Services to the Republic of Austria
 1997: Gold Decoration for Services to the country of Lower Austria
 2000: Austrian Decoration for Science and Art
 2009: culture prize of the city of Horn

Discography (excerpt) 
 Composers of the court of the Holy Roman Empire: G. Muffat, G. C. Wagenseil, J. J. Fux and J. J. Froberger (MHS 601, 1965?)
 Masters of the French Baroque von Jean-Marie Leclair (MHS 655, 1966)
 Rococo delights von Hilde Langfort (1966)
 Spohr Nonet in F, Op. 31, Double-Quartett in E minor, op. 87 (DECCA SSD416, 1974)
 Four sonatas for flute and continuo von Johann Joachim Quantz (MHS 1038, 1979)
 Josef Matthias Hauer (Dokumentationsreihe des Österreichischen Komponistenbundes 1 Vol. 11, 1972)
 F. Schubert: Atzenbrugger Tänze (EMI C05-33232, 1978)
 Caprice Viennois (1985)
 Musik für Streicher (1988)
 Tanztheater 1975-2000 von Peer Raben (BMG Ariola Classics, 2004)
 Duo für Violine und Violoncello von Maximilian Kreuz (Kulinarium Wien - ÖGZM, ?)
 String quartet no. 2a von Nancy Van de Vate (Vienna Modern Masters, 2010)
 Cant del ocells (2011)
 String quartet no. 10 von Don Walker (Vienna Modern Masters, 2013)

Bibliography 
Die Diskografie wird von Beiträgen in Büchern ergänzt:
„Internationales Kammermusik Festival Austria – Allegro Vivo“ (1988)
„Allegro Vivo – Das Waldviertel als Musikviertel“ (1993)
„Fortissimo für die Kammermusik“ (Bibliothek der Provinz 2003)
„Allegro Vivo in Bewegung“ (2009)
 Musikhandbuch für Österreich (Hg. ÖGM, Doblinger, 2009)

Between 1998 und 2007 Josef Luitz interviewed numerous artist for the Austrian Music.

Sources 

Living people
Austrian male musicians
Austrian classical cellists
Recipients of the Decoration of Honour for Services to the Republic of Austria
Recipients of the Austrian Cross of Honour for Science and Art
Year of birth missing (living people)